The George Blumenthal House was a mansion located on 50 East 70th Street in New York City. It was constructed for George Blumenthal.

Further reading 
 

Upper East Side

Demolished buildings and structures in Manhattan